Salome Kammer (born 17 January 1959 in Nidda, Hesse, West Germany) is a German actress, singer and cellist.

Professional career 
Kammer was the fourth of six children. Her father was a Protestant pastor. Although born in Nidda, she grew up in Ober-Mockstadt, before her family moved to Frankfurt when she was eight. 

Kammer studied at the Folkwang Hochschule from 1977 to 1984, cello with Maria Kliegel and Janos Starker. She was a member of the Heidelberg theater from 1983. In 1988 she played the role of Clarissa Lichtblau in the film Die Zweite Heimat, its sequel, Heimat 3, and the complementary Fragments – The Women (Fragmente – die Frauen), by Edgar Reitz.

Now married to Reitz, she lives in Munich and is a noted performer of contemporary classical music.

In 2008 she recorded as Salomix-Max as a tribute to soprano Cathy Berberian, music of Cole Porter, Luciano Berio, Wolfgang Amadeus Mozart, Johann Valentin Görner, Carola Bauckholt, Tarquinio Merula, Alban Berg, Harold Arlen, Rudi Spring, Kurt Weill, Helmut Oehring and Nikolai Rimsky-Korsakov. In 2009 she appeared in songs and Chansons of the 1920s to 1940s, accompanied by Spring, at the Rheingau Musik Festival. In 2011 she appeared at the festival in the Komponistenporträt of Hans Zender in his denn wiederkommen (Hölderlin lesen III) and Mnemosyne (Hölderlin lesen IV) with the Athena Quartet.

Awards 
2003: Schneider-Schott Music Prize, with Thomas E. Bauer

Premieres of musical stage works 
William Osborne: Beeb & Bab, Munich 1995
Helmut Oehring: Dokumentaroper, Witten 1995 
Eric Ona: Beware of the Dog, Stuttgart 1996
Helmut Oehring: Das D'Amato-System, Munich 1996
Carola Bauckholt: Es wird sich zeigen, Berlin 1999
Mauricio Sotelo: De Amore, Munich 1999
Jörg Widmann: Befreiung aus dem Paradies, Hannover 2000
Helmut Oehring, Iris ter Schiphorst: Effi Briest, Bonn 2001
Jörg Widmann: Das Gesicht im Spiegel (role: Patricia), Munich 2003
Isabel Mundry: Ein Atemzug – Die Odyssee (role: Penelope), Berlin 2005 
Bernhard Lang: I Hate Mozart (role: Franziska), Vienna 2006
Alexandra Holtsch: Barcode for 2 turntable players, baritone, soprano, and actors, Munich 2007
Georges Aperghis: Zeugen, Witten 2007
Peter Eötvös: Lady Sarashina (role: Mezzo), Lyon 2008
Brice Pauset: Exercises du Silence for voice, piano and electronic. IRCAM, Paris 2008
Richard Rijnvos: barbara baccante (role: Barbara Strozzi), Amsterdam 2014
 Hristina Šušak: Affectus III for voice and ensemble, Halle 2022

References

External links
 Salome Kammer's web site
 

1959 births
Living people
People from Nidda
German stage actresses
German classical cellists
German film actresses
Folkwang University of the Arts alumni